Nolčovo is a village and municipality in Martin District in the Žilina Region of northern Slovakia.

History
In historical records the village was first mentioned in 1571.

Geography
The municipality lies at an altitude of 408 metres and covers an area of 15.018 km². It has a population of about 254 people.

References

External links

Villages and municipalities in Martin District